The title of champion, or leading, sire of racehorses in Great Britain and Ireland is awarded to the stallion whose offspring have won the most prize money in Britain and Ireland during the flat racing season. The current (2022) champion is Dubawi, who earned his first title after finishing runner-up multiple times.

Unlike the similar title for leading sire in North America, the stallion in question does not need to have resided in Great Britain or Ireland during his stud career, although the vast majority have done so. Northern Dancer is the most notable example of a North American-based stallion who won this title. The Northern Dancer sire line has dominated the list for the last several decades, mostly through his son Sadler's Wells (14 titles) and grandson Galileo (12 titles).

Records

Most championships:
 14 – Sadler's Wells – 1990, 1992–2004
 13 – Highflyer – 1785–1796, 1798
 12 – Galileo – 2008, 2010–2020
 10 – Sir Peter Teazle – 1799–1802, 1804–1809
 9 – St. Simon – 1890–1896, 1900–1901
 8 – Regulus – 1754–1757, 1761, 1763, 1765–1766; Herod – 1777–1784

Champion sires 1721–1997

 1721 – Acaster Turk (1)
 1722 – Darley Arabian (1)
 1723 – Thoulouse Barb (1)
 1724 – Bay Bolton (1)
 1725 – Bald Galloway (1)
 1726 – Bay Bolton (2)
 1727 – Bay Bolton (3)
 1728 – Alcock's Arabian (1)
 1729 – Bay Bolton (4)
 1730 – Flying Childers (1)
 1731 – Fox (1)
 1732 – Bay Bolton (5)
 1733 – Bay Bolton (6)
 1734 – Bay Bolton (7)
 1735 – Fox (2)
 1736 – Flying Childers (2)
 1737 – Partner (1)
 1738 – Godolphin Arabian (1)
 1739 – Bloody Buttocks (1)
 1740 – Partner (2)
 1741 – Partner (3)
 1742 – Bartlett's Childers (1)
 1743 – Partner (4)
 1744 – Bolton Starling (1)
 1745 – Godolphin Arabian (2)
 1746 – Blacklegs (1)
 1747 – Godolphin Arabian (3)
 1748 – Crab (1)
 1749 – Crab (2)
 1750 – Crab (3)
 1751 – Blaze (1)
 1752 – Cade (1)
 1753 – Cade (2)
 1754 – Regulus (1)
 1755 – Regulus (2)
 1756 – Regulus (3)
 1757 – Regulus (4)
 1758 – Cade (3)
 1759 – Cade (4)
 1760 – Cade (5)
 1761 – Regulus (5)
 1762 – Blank (1)
 1763 – Regulus (6)
 1764 – Blank (2)
 1765 – Regulus (7)
 1766 – Regulus (8)
 1767 – Snap (1)
 1768 – Snap (2)
 1769 – Snap (3)
 1770 – Blank (3)
 1771 – Snap (4)
 1772 – Matchem (1)
 1773 – Matchem (2)
 1774 – Matchem (3)
 1775 – Marske (1)
 1776 – Marske (2)
 1777 – Herod (1)
 1778 – Herod (2)
 1779 – Herod (3)
 1780 – Herod (4)
 1781 – Herod (5)
 1782 – Herod (6)
 1783 – Herod (7)
 1784 – Herod (8)
 1785 – Highflyer (1)
 1786 – Highflyer (2)
 1787 – Highflyer (3)
 1788 – Highflyer (4)
 1789 – Highflyer (5)
 1790 – Highflyer (6)
 1791 – Highflyer (7)
 1792 – Highflyer (8)
 1793 – Highflyer (9)
 1794 – Highflyer (10)
 1795 – Highflyer (11)
 1796 – Highflyer (12)
 1797 – King Fergus (1)
 1798 – Highflyer (13)
 1799 – Sir Peter Teazle (1)
 1800 – Sir Peter Teazle (2)
 1801 – Sir Peter Teazle (3)
 1802 – Sir Peter Teazle (4)
 1803 – Trumpator (1)
 1804 – Sir Peter Teazle (5)
 1805 – Sir Peter Teazle (6)
 1806 – Sir Peter Teazle (7)
 1807 – Sir Peter Teazle (8)
 1808 – Sir Peter Teazle (9)
 1809 – Sir Peter Teazle (10)
 1810 – Waxy (1)
 1811 – Sorcerer (1)
 1812 – Sorcerer (2)
 1813 – Sorcerer (3)
 1814 – Selim (1)
 1815 – Rubens (1)
 1816 – Walton (1)
 1817 – Orville (1)
 1818 – Walton (2)
 1819 – Soothsayer (1)
 1820 – Phantom (1)
 1821 – Rubens (2)
 1822 – Rubens (3)
 1823 – Orville (2)
 1824 – Phantom (2)
 1825 – Election (1)
 1826 – Whalebone (1)
 1827 – Whalebone (2)
 1828 – Filho da Puta (1)
 1829 – Blacklock (1)
 1830 – Emilius (1)
 1831 – Emilius (2)
 1832 – Sultan (1)
 1833 – Sultan (2)
 1834 – Sultan (3)
 1835 – Sultan (4)
 1836 – Sultan (5)
 1837 – Sultan (6)
 1838 – Camel (1)
 1839 – Priam (1)
 1840 – Priam (2)
 1841 – Taurus (1)
 1842 – Touchstone (1)
 1843 – Touchstone (2)
 1844 – Bay Middleton (1)
 1845 – Slane (1)
 1846 – Venison (1)
 1847 – Venison (2)
 1848 – Touchstone (3)
 1849 – Bay Middleton (2)
 1850 – Epirus (1)
 1851 – Orlando (1)
 1852 – Birdcatcher (1)
 1853 – Melbourne (1)
 1854 – Orlando (2)
 1855 – Touchstone (4)
 1856 – Birdcatcher (2)
 1857 – Melbourne (2)
 1858 – Orlando (3)
 1859 – Newminster (1)
 1860 – Stockwell (1)
 1861 – Stockwell (2)
 1862 – Stockwell (3)
 1863 – Newminster (2)
 1864 – Stockwell (4)
 1865 – Stockwell (5)
 1866 – Stockwell (6)
 1867 – Stockwell (7)
 1868 – Buccaneer (1)
 1869 – Thormanby (1)
 1870 – King Tom (1)
 1871 – King Tom (2)
 1872 – Blair Athol (1)
 1873 – Blair Athol (2)
 1874 – Adventurer (1)
 1875 – Blair Athol (3)
 1876 – Lord Clifden (1)
 1877 – Blair Athol (4)
 1878 – Speculum (1)
 1879 – Flageolet (1)
 1880 – Hermit (1)
 1881 – Hermit (2)
 1882 – Hermit (3)
 1883 – Hermit (4)
 1884 – Hermit (5)
 1885 – Hermit (6)
 1886 – Hermit (7)
 1887 – Hampton (1)
 1888 – Galopin (1)
 1889 – Galopin (2)
 1890 – St. Simon (1)
 1891 – St. Simon (2)
 1892 – St. Simon (3)
 1893 – St. Simon (4)
 1894 – St. Simon (5)
 1895 – St. Simon (6)
 1896 – St. Simon (7)
 1897 – Kendal (1)
 1898 – Galopin (3)
 1899 – Orme (1)
 1900 – St. Simon (8)
 1901 – St. Simon (9)
 1902 – Persimmon (1)
 1903 – St. Frusquin (1)
 1904 – Gallinule (1)
 1905 – Gallinule (2)
 1906 – Persimmon (1)
 1907 – St. Frusquin (1)
 1908 – Persimmon (2)
 1909 – Cyllene (1)
 1910 – Cyllene (2)
 1911 – Sundridge (1)
 1912 – Persimmon (3)
 1913 – Desmond (1)
 1914 – Polymelus (1)
 1915 – Polymelus (2)
 1916 – Polymelus (3)
 1917 – Bayardo (1)
 1918 – Bayardo (2)
 1919 – The Tetrarch (1)
 1920 – Polymelus (4)
 1921 – Polymelus (5)
 1922 – Lemberg (1)
 1923 – Swynford (1)
 1924 – Son-in-Law (1)
 1925 – Phalaris (1)
 1926 – Hurry On (1)
 1927 – Buchan (1)
 1928 – Phalaris (2)
 1929 – Tetratema (1)
 1930 – Son-in-Law (2)
 1931 – Pharos (1)
 1932 – Gainsborough (1)
 1933 – Gainsborough (2)
 1934 – Blandford (1)
 1935 – Blandford (2)
 1936 – Fairway (1)
 1937 – Solario (1)
 1938 – Blandford (3)
 1939 – Fairway (2)
 1940 – Hyperion (1)
 1941 – Hyperion (2)
 1942 – Hyperion (3)
 1943 – Fairway (3)
 1944 – Fairway (4)
 1945 – Hyperion (4)
 1946 – Hyperion (5)
 1947 – Nearco (1)
 1948 – Big Game (1)
 1949 – Nearco (2)
 1950 – Fair Trial (1)
 1951 – Nasrullah (1)
 1952 – Tehran (1)
 1953 – Chanteur (1)
 1954 – Hyperion (6)
 1955 – Alycidon (1)
 1956 – Court Martial (1)
 1957 – Court Martial (2)
 1958 – Mossborough (1)
 1959 – Petition (1)
 1960 – Aureole (1)
 1961 – Aureole (2)
 1962 – Never Say Die (1)
 1963 – Ribot (1)
 1964 – Chamossaire (1)
 1965 – Court Harwell (1)
 1966 – Charlottesville (1)
 1967 – Ribot (2)
 1968 – Ribot (3)
 1969 – Crepello (1)
 1970 – Northern Dancer (1)
 1971 – Never Bend (1)
 1972 – Queen's Hussar (1)
 1973 – Vaguely Noble (1)
 1974 – Vaguely Noble (2)
 1975 – Great Nephew (1)
 1976 – Wolver Hollow (1)
 1977 – Northern Dancer (2)
 1978 – Mill Reef (1)
 1979 – Petingo (1)
 1980 – Pitcairn (1)
 1981 – Great Nephew (1)
 1982 – Be My Guest (1)
 1983 – Northern Dancer (3)
 1984 – Northern Dancer (4)
 1985 – Kris (1)
 1986 – Nijinsky (1)
 1987 – Mill Reef (2)
 1988 – Caerleon (1)
 1989 – Blushing Groom (1)
 1990 – Sadler's Wells (1)
 1991 – Caerleon (2)
 1992 – Sadler's Wells (2)
 1993 – Sadler's Wells (3)
 1994 – Sadler's Wells (4)
 1995 – Sadler's Wells (5)
 1996 – Sadler's Wells (6)
 1997 – Sadler's Wells (7)

Champion sires since 1998

Top sire lines
Excluding any championships by the foundation stallions themselves, the following sire-lines have produced champion sires (1721–2016):
 Darley Arabian –  88 stallions, 188 championships. all titles since 1964
 Byerley Turk –  17 stallions, 59 championships, most recently Tetratema in 1929
 Godolphin Arabian – 12 stallions, 32 championships, most recently Chamossaire in 1964
 D'Arcy White Turk – 3 stallions, 10 championships, most recently Bolton Starling in 1744
 Curwen's Bay Barb – 2 stallions, 4 championships, most recently Crab in 1750
 Acaster Turk, Bloody Buttocks, St. Victor's Barb, Thoulouse Barb – 1 championship each

See also
 Leading sire in Australia
 Leading sire in France
 Leading sire in Germany
 Leading sire in Japan
 Leading sire in North America
 Leading broodmare sire in Great Britain & Ireland
 Leading broodmare sire in North America
 Leading jump racing sire in Great Britain & Ireland

References 

 tbheritage.com

Horse racing in Great Britain
Horse racing in Ireland